The 1999 Nigerian Senate election in Imo State was held on February 20, 1999, to elect members of the Nigerian Senate to represent Imo State. Ifeanyi Ararume representing Imo North and Evan Enwerem representing Imo East won on the platform of Peoples Democratic Party, while Arthur Nzeribe representing Imo West won on the platform of the All Nigeria Peoples Party.

Overview

Summary

Results

Imo North 
The election was won by Ifeanyi Ararume of the People's Democratic Party (Nigeria).

Imo East 
The election was won by Evan Enwerem of the People's Democratic Party (Nigeria).

Imo West 
The election was won by Arthur Nzeribe of the All Nigeria Peoples Party.

References 

Imo
Imo
Imo State Senate elections